Sir Zibang Zurenuoc KBE (born September 1927 at Sattleberg, Finschhafen; died 5 February 2008 in Port Moresby) was a Papua New Guinean businessman and politician.

He served as a co-operative officer in the colonial public service in New Ireland when Papua New Guinea was under Australian colonial administration. In 1958, he set up the "now famous" Finschhafen Marketing and Development Co-operative (FMDC). He was also a founding director of Mainland Holdings. He was subsequently appointed business representative to the Morobe Constituent Assembly, and served as chairman of Morobe's Constituent Assembly.

In the 1977 general election, the first after the country's independence, he was elected to the National Parliament as MP for Finschhafen. He later served as Deputy Speaker and was also a government minister. He was Minister for Community and Family Services to Prime Minister Julius Chan in the early 1980s. He was "long-time general secretary" of the People's Progress Party.

In 1994, Elizabeth II, Queen of Papua New Guinea, on the advice of the Papua New Guinean government, appointed him Knight Commander of the Order of the British Empire, "for community services".

The Zurenuoc family has had a number of distinguished members. His brother Sir Zurewe Zerenuoc was the first Papua New Guinean to head the Evangelical Lutheran Church of Papua New Guinea. His other brother, Zure Makili Zurenuoc, was "a pioneer educationist" and also served as MP for Finschhafen after him. His nephew Guao Zurenuoc was MP for Finschhafen from 2002 to 2007, and his (Zibang's) son Theo Zurenuoc had been MP for Finschhafen from 2007 to 2017.

He died in Port Moresby on 5 February 2008 "after undergoing medical treatment".

References

1927 births
2008 deaths
Knights Commander of the Order of the British Empire
Members of the National Parliament of Papua New Guinea
Government ministers of Papua New Guinea
People's Progress Party politicians
20th-century Papua New Guinean businesspeople
Papua New Guinean knights
People from Morobe Province